Sucuali is a village in the Tercan District of Erzincan Province in Turkey.

References

Villages in Tercan District